Ananda Dawn Jacobs (born March 12, 1983) is an American actress, singer, model, producer, and composer.

Early life
Jacobs was born in Los Angeles, California. She grew up in Arizona and Washingston. She has three sisters, Starlet, who is an artist, Nova, who is a writer, and Moksha, who is also an actress. In 2004, she graduated from University of Southern California with a double degree in psychology and music.

Personal life

In 2006, she moved to Japan where she started her career as an actress and voice actor.

Filmography

References

External links

1983 births
American film actresses
American television actresses
American video game actresses
American voice actresses
American expatriates in Japan
Actresses from Los Angeles
Living people
Models from Los Angeles
Singers from Los Angeles
University of Southern California alumni
21st-century American actresses
People from Poulsbo, Washington
21st-century American singers
Singer-songwriters from California
Singer-songwriters from Washington (state)